Mohun Bagan Athletic Club is an Indian professional multi-sports club based in Kolkata, West Bengal. Founded in 1889, its football section is one of the oldest in India and Asia. The club is most notable for its victory over East Yorkshire Regiment in the 1911 IFA Shield final. This victory made Mohun Bagan the first all-Indian side to win a championship over a British side and was a major moment during India's push for independence. Although Mohun Bagan is a multi-sport club, the primary sport since its foundation had been football.

They have won the top-flight football league a record five times – the National Football League three times, and the I-League twice. They were the most successful team of India in the history of the Federation Cup, having won the championship a record 14 times. The club had also won several other trophies, including the Durand Cup (16 times), IFA Shield (22 times), Rovers Cup (14 times), and the Calcutta Football League (30 times). The club won various minor and major trophies throughout its history. The club contested the Kolkata Derby with long-time local rivals East Bengal Club with the first derby match played on 8 August 1921. The club also shared a rivalry with another local club, Mohammedan SC. On 2014 Niranjan Kakati was felicitated by the club for highest cleansheet record.
Mohun Bagan was inducted into the Club of Pioneers, a network of the oldest existing football clubs around the world, on 29 July 2019 as the club celebrated its 130th year in existence.

Mohun Bagan was inducted into the Club of Pioneers, a network of the oldest existing football clubs around the world, on 29 July 2019 as the club celebrated its 130th year in existence.

Since 2020, ATK Mohun Bagan FC succeeded the football operations of Mohun Bagan after Kolkata Games and Sports Private Limited, the company that owned ATK FC, took an 80% stake in Mohun Bagan. ATK FC as a football club dissolved on 1 June 2020 and ATK Mohun Bagan FC continues playing with the existing registration of Mohun Bagan with AIFF and IFA.

From the ISL 2023-24 season, ATK Mohun Bagan will again be renamed as Mohun Bagan Super Giants after the fans intense request. Finally after winning the trophy in the ISL 2022-23 season, in the presentation ceremony chairman Sanjiv Goenka announced that new name removing ATK.

History

Formation and early years (1880s)

The foundation of Mohun Bagan AC stretches back into the 1880s when the neighborhood youth of presently known Fariapukur Lane in Shyambazar had set out in search for an ideal place to establish a football club, and came across a marble palace, Mohun Bagan Villa, owned by the family of a leading jute trader, Kirti Chandra Mitra.

On 15 August 1889, after a meeting of three famous aristocratic Bengali families of North Kolkata – the Mitra family, the Basu family, and the Sen family, and other distinguished personalities, presided over by Bhupendra Nath Basu himself, Mohun Bagan Sporting Club was formed. Bhupendra Nath Basu became the first president of the newly founded club and Jyotindra Nath Basu was the first secretary of it.

During the initial years, the meager ground inside the palace was used by the club for hosting matches, including their first match that was played against the team of Eden Hindu Hostel students, and lost 1–0. The initial players to play for the club were Girin Basu, Pramatha Nath Chattopadhyay, Sachin Bandhyopadhyay, Ram Goswami, Sarat Mitra, Hem Nath Sen, Nalin Basu, Upen Ghosh, Manindra Nath Basu, Manomoham Pandey, Probhas Mitra, and the captain Manilal Sen. Priyanath Mitra, the successor of Kirti Mitra, had the club's iconic Green-Maroon jerseys stitched by a renowned European tailoring shop, Messrs Rankin at Old Couse House Street. The club management hugely emphasized providing memberships to the youth and maintained a strict code of conduct with an avowed objective of producing excellent sportsmen and imbuing them with impeccable moral and social values.

At the first-anniversary assembly, the Presidency College students and members of the club invited their professor, F. J. Rowe, to attend. Rowe pointed out the inappropriate naming of the club and suggested replacing "Sporting" with "Athletic" since the club didn't indulge in sporting activities, like angling or rifle shooting. Thus, the members agreed and renamed the club as Mohun Bagan Athletic Club.

The second-anniversary assembly was presided by Sir Thomas Holland, who later became a member of the Executive Council of Governor-General of India. In 1891, with the help of the Maharaja Durga Charan Laha of Shyampukur, the club ground was relocated within his residential estate, now known as Laha Colony. The club ground was later relocated to Shyam Square in Bagbazar, with the help of the Kolkata Municipal Corporation chairman, Henry Lee. The first tournament that the club participated in was the 1893 Coochbehar Cup, where the team suffered to perform against the British Indian Army teams and the clubs like Aryan, National, Town Club, Kumurtuli, Fort William's Arsenal and the famed Sovabazar, which was founded by the Father of Indian football Nagendra Prasad Sarbadhikari himself. In 1900, Mohun Bagan became the partner of Presidency College and shared their ground at Maidan, where they would continue to play for 15 years.

Administrative and tactical overhaul under Subedar-major Sailen Basu (1900s)
The early exits from major tournaments suffered in the 1900s evoked ridicule from its local rivals, including Sovabazar. Soon after the appointment of Subedar-major Sailen Basu as the secretary, the club adopted European playing methods and players underwent rigorous physical training and followed austere fitness regime similar to what Subedar-major Basu had experienced during his service in the army. The club also began recruiting players from other clubs, especially from National, where footballers played in boots rather than barefoot. Rev. Sudhir Chatterjee was one of the notable recruitment from National, who was also the only player in the club to play in boots at that time. As a result of such incredible changes made, the club achieved its first success by winning the 1904 Coochbehar Cup.

The following year Mohun Bagan won the Coochbehar Cup once again and reached the Gladstone Cup final, held in Chinsurah, where they defeated the reigning IFA Shield champions Dalhousie 6–1, with Shibdas Bhaduri scoring four goals. Maharaja Rajendra Bhup Bahadur of Coochbehar, impressed by the team, would become a chief patron of the club. In 1906, Mohun Bagan also won the Minto Fort tournament by defeating one of the major English clubs in India, Calcutta. But they missed the chance of participating for the 1906 IFA Shield because P.K. Biswas, who had played for National but also played for Mohun Bagan in the same year, which was considered illegal by the Indian Football Association, the then de facto governing body of Indian football. Therefore Mohun Bagan was disqualified.

Apart from team building, Subedar-major Basu had a remarkable contribution in arranging a new club tent and ground after the demolition of Mohun Bagan Villa in 1891. The club did not have a permanent club tent and had an increasing number of club members through a minimal membership fee of 8 annas, half for students. During this period, a major meeting was held among the club officials, including Jyotindra Nath Basu, Subedar-major Sailen Basu, Dwijendra Nath Basu, Sir Bhupendra Nath Mitra and Dr. Girish Ghosh. The meeting was regarding the construction of a club tent at Maidan, which was financially not feasible. A few days later, a club tent within Mohun Bagan's premises in Maidan was constructed and is still in use. To date, there is no evidence of this in the financial records of the club, and the donors remain unknown. Mohun Bagan also won the Trades Cup four consecutive times between 1906 and 1909, which was the second most prestigious tournament in India after IFA Shield. Mohun Bagan won Coochbehar Cup in 1907 and 1908, and then both the Laxmibilas Cup and the Gladstone Cup in 1909 and 1910.

The historic year of 1911

In 1909 and 1910, among only a few other native clubs, the team had the honor to play in the IFA Shield for its consistent performances over the recent years. However, they would struggle to match the regiment teams of British and British Indian armies in the first two years. In 1911, Mohun Bagan formed a dominant side for the IFA Shield, which included Hiralal Mukherjee, Bhuti Sukul, Rev. Sudhir Chatterjee, Monmohun Mukherjee, Rajen Sengupta, Nil Madhav Bhattacharya, Kanu Roy, Habul Sarkar, Abhilash Ghosh, Bijoydas Bhaduri and captained by Shibdas Bhaduri. They battled out against the professionally equipped teams of St. Xavier's College, Calcutta Rangers Club, Rifle Brigade and Middlesex Regiment to reach the IFA Shield final without conceding a goal. The enthusiasm for the final on 29 July 1911 (which is now known as "Mohun Bagan Day") was such that people came from other districts of Bengal as well as from neighboring provinces of Bihar and Assam. The East Indian Railway Company ran a special train and additional steamer services were pressed into service to ferry spectators to Calcutta from the mofussil areas. After trailing by a goal from Sgt. Jackson of East Yorkshire Regiment team within the first 15 minutes of the 50 minutes of the match, Shibdas Bhaduri soon scored an equalizer in the first half and then set up Abhilash Ghosh to score the winner with just two minutes remaining of the match. The club became the first native team to lift the IFA Shield, that too in front of an estimated crowd of 80,000, although the referee, H.G. Pooler, estimated approximately 20,000 to be the number. Reuters in its cablegram to English newspapers mentioned: "For the first time in the history of Indian football an Indian team, the Mohun Bagan, consisting purely of Bengalees, has won the Indian Football Association Shield beating crack teams of English regiments. About 80,000 spectators were present on the ground, but most of them could not see the match. By noticing the flying of kites, they were following the actions of the match. And when they came to know about the win of their team, they started tearing off their shirts, waving them, tearing their hairs." The mood can be gauged by what Achintya Kumar Sengupta wrote in Kallol Jug: "Mohun Bagan is not a football team. It is a tortured country, rolling in the dust, which has just started to raise its head." Mohun Bagan supporters and the public at large went berserk, even supporters of Muslim representative clubs like Moslem and Mohammedan went to the streets to celebrate and the Muslims from Dharmatala joined the victory procession of Hindus near the Thanthania Kalibari. On 31 July 1911, The Englishman wrote, "What the Congress failed to achieve, Mohun Bagan has. In other words, they have succeeded in degrading the English." The performance was appreciated by Manchester Guardian saying, "The team  the Bengalis won the IFA Shield by defeating three top military teams. 80,000 Indians will remain witnesses to this event. There is nothing to be surprised at. The team that is physically more fit, has sharp surveillance and intelligence, wins.". On 30 July 1911, India Mirror reported, "The Japanese victory over the Russians did not stir the East half as much as did the match between Mohun Bagan and East York." After the match ended, a Brahmin, pointing to the Union Jack fluttering atop Fort William, asked Rev. Chatterjee, "When will that come down?" and according to popular legend, it was predicted that the flag would come down only when Mohun Bagan regained the shield, which would later come true.

Nation-wide exposure of the club (1912–30)
After a comparatively disappointing year in 1912, Shibdas Bhaduri handed the captaincy to Habul Sarkar the following year, but they failed to win any trophy that year. The same year Gostha Pal joined the club as a defender at the young age of 16 and continued to play for 22 years, also leading the team from 1921 to 1926, soon became known as the "Chinese Wall". In 1914, Mohun Bagan for the first time played in CFL 2nd Division and finished third with only the top non-military team be promoted to CFL 1st Division but after a team from the 1st Division withdrew, Mohun Bagan got promoted. Mohun Bagan played their first match on 15 May 1915 against Calcutta, which was drawn. Meanwhile, Subedar-major Sailen Basu had to leave for his commitments in the military service for the World War I. Dwijendra Nath Basu, nephew of Bhupendra Nath Basu and brother of Subedar-major Basu, replaced him as the club's secretary. Mohun Bagan finished fourth in their league debut, while a junior team of the club made the semi-finals of the Trades Cup and Coochbehar Cup. The next year, Mohun Bagan reached the second position in the league and the following year, narrowly lost the IFA Shield final to Middlesex Regiment.

On 8 August 1921, the club played its first match against East Bengal Club in the Coochbehar Cup semi-final, which ended in a goalless draw, but Mohun Bagn went on to beat them in the replay by 1–0 and gave rise to the Kolkata Derby. In 1922, Mohun Bagan played exhibition matches of cricket and football against a team of Indians from South Africa. The following year, Mohun Bagan was invited to Rovers Cup in Bombay, where they lost to Durham Light Infantry by 4–1. After 35 years of long association of Bhupendra Nath Basu with Mohun Bagan came to an end with his demise in 1924. After his death, Sir Rajendranath Mukherjee became the club's new president. The next year, Mohun Bagan became the first civilian Indian team to be invited to the oldest football tournament in Asia, Durand Cup, where they lost to Sherwood Foresters in the semi-finals. That year Mohun Bagan also failed to win the league and finished second. During this period, the club attended as well as hosted numerous charity matches all over the country for fundraising as the earnings from memberships weren't enough to run the club over a long period. On 28 May 1925, the club played its first official Derby against East Bengal and lost by 1–0. That year club played a charity match against Cheshire Regiment in 1927 to raise relief funds for the floods in Gujarat. In 1929, due to a clash during the match of Mohun Bagan and Dalhousie, all the native teams withdrew their names from the IFA registration. Later, it was negotiated on the condition that there would be equal number of European and Indian clubs in the association.

Significant contributions to the national team (1931–47)

Renowned Barrister Shailendra Nath Banerjee became the secretary of the club with the turn of the decade. In 1931 the club acquired the services of highly skilled players like, Karuna 'Habla' Bhattacharya and Syed Abdus Samad. In 1933, Gostho Pal got selected as the captain of IFA XI representing India for an away match against Ceylon, but the following year, due to injury, his defence partner Dr. Sanmatha Dutta led the tour to South Africa for a series of matches. 1935 saw a great change in Mohun Bagan’s tradition of playing with bare-feet when on the behest of Abdul Hamid, a renowned player who joined from Quetta, the club decided to use boots for the first time. In 1937, Mohun Bagan for the first time faced off against a foreign team – an English amateur club Islington Corinthians, who were on a world tour; but narrowly lost by 1–0. In 1938 the tradition of Mohun Bagan players leading IFA teams continued with Karuna Bhattacharya captaining a side to Australia, where he also scored against Australia as well as Football Queensland team during the tour. Mohun Bagan also broke a 29-year-old barren run in Trades Cup, in 1938. In second half 1930s both Umapati Kumar and Gostha Pal had retired, but the squad got competent reinforcements – Anil Dey in half back position and Satyen 'Mana' Guin in attack, who a right winger was nicknamed "Racing Deer" for his speed along the flanks. Captained by Bimal Mukherjee, son of Manmohan Mukherjee, and a host of quality players, Mohun Bagan broke their long wait for a major trophy in 1939 when they won their first ever Calcutta Football League title. Significantly, Mohun Bagan also celebrated its golden jubilee the same year, which was marked with celebrations across the city, match organized featuring renowned former players and medals and jerseys were distributed to the players. From 1933 to 1939 the club won 29 trophies, also out of 23 Derbies, they beat East Bengal 12 times, including 1 walkover win, drew 10 matches and lost only once to their arch-rival.

In 1941, the secretaryship was given to another famed barrister, B.C. Ghosh replaced Sailen Banerjee, who was elected as the club's vice-president. In 1942, for the first time, an insurance policy was implemented for the medical aid of the injured players during matches, and a medical board composed of reputed doctors was formed to oversee the medical issues. A trusty board was also formed on the initiative of a Solicitor B.K.Ghosh and Barrister S.K.Gupta for the monetary support of the club. In 1943 and 1944, Mohun Bagan won CFL in succession. In 1944, B.C. Ghosh became the club's vice-president, and Dr. S.K. Gupta took charge of the general secretary's office. Meanwhile, a junior football team was formed under the guidance of a former Mohun Bagan player, Balaidas Chattopadhyay, and also made efforts to introduce sports like rugby and baseball among the youth. In 1945, former vice-president and first captain of Mohun Bagan Manilal Sen expired. The same year, George Curtis, who was an Arsenal player stationed in India as a part of Royal Air Force in the World War II, took charge of the team as a coach for a brief stint. In 1947, Mohun Bagan got invitation to Madurai Cup but was beaten by Hyderabad Police in the final. This year the team once again participated in Rover’s Cup. Still, the tournament was called off due to the collapse of the Cooperage Ground during the quarter-final match against 1st Battalion, South Staffordshire Regiment. This year Mohun Bagan won its second IFA Shield on 15 November by defeating its arch-rival East Bengal, thus fulfilling the prophecy of the club winning its second Shield only in the year of India's independence, and becoming the first club to win the Shield in post-independent India.

Struggle with consistency (1948–1950s)

In the first year after the independence, the club handed the captaincy for two years to Talimeren Ao, who had been a part of the club since 1943 after leaving Maharana Club in Guwahati. Ao went on to lead the national team in 1948 Summer Olympics in London, and along with him Mahabir Prasad and Sailen Manna. The club's secretary, Balai Das Chattopadhyay too had to leave for London as the team's head coach and trainer, therefore Gostho Pal took charge of his duties in club temporarily. Anil Dey was selected for the team as well but stayed behind. Dhanadaranjan' Bokai' Sen carried out the captain's duties in the absence of Ao. In the same year, the Kingdom of Afghanistan invited Mohun Bagan on the occasion of their independence celebrations. Still, the club couldn't attend because of its preplanned agenda. That year, Mohun Bagan successfully defended the IFA Shield against Bhawanipore in the final. After the Olympics, Ao played for the club until 1953 and retired to pursue a career in medicine after completing MBBS. His excellence on-field caught the eyes of many foreign clubs, including Arsenal, who offered a one-year contract to Ao, but he famously refused to carry on with his studies.

The year 1949 was the club's diamond jubilee. On this occasion, a vivid procession was organized on 11 December, from the club's birthplace, Balaram Ghosh Street. On the occasion West Bengal’s Chief Minister Dr. Bidhan Chandra Roy commented, "I am proud and delighted that, fortunately, I have witnessed the IFA Shield tournament of 1911. During the freedom struggle, Mohun Bagan’s existence inspired the youth. In the sports world of Bengal, Mohun Bagan has still maintained its excellence. Even after 60 years, Mohun Bagan has kept its youth unaffected. I pray that on our beloved Motherland, Mohun Bagan’s sporting spirit may survive forever," and attended the ceremonies and exhibitions hosted by the club. Mohun Bagan also invited Swedish club Helsingborgs to play three friendlies, along with many other exhibition matches of cricket, hockey and football. Runu Guha Thakurta, a renowned forward, was acquired by the club that year. In 1950, India had received a direct qualification to the FIFA World Cup, with Manna being the captain of the team, but All India Football Federation refused to play, failing to realize its importance. Despite acquiring the services of some of the famed players, the club failed to dominate in major tournaments, where they were regularly outshined by the Pancha Pandavas led East Bengal and Syed Abdul Rahim's Hyderabad City Police team.

S Manna, T Aao, Abhay Ghosh, and R Guhathakurta got their call for the national team to play the Asian Games, and Manna led the team to the gold medal. In 1952 Summer Olympics three Mohun Bagan players including Manna as the captain and Mohammad Abdus Sattar, who joined the club from Mohammedan in 1950. Mohun Bagan won the CFL in 1951 after a wait of seven years, the IFA Shield in 1952, and its first Durand Cup in 1953 by 4–0 against National Defence Academy team. During the prize distribution of Durand Cup, the President of India Dr. Rajendra Prasad said, "Mohun Bagan was my favorite team from my childhood. I was a regular visitor of all Mohun Bagan matches when I was a student at Kolkata. Sometimes, when I didn’t have money to buy the ticket, I could not stop myself. I watched the match from the outside. I was always aware of the up-to-date news of the club." That year Samar 'Badru' Banerjee joined the team and formed an important attacking duo with Md. Sattar. During Manna's spell as the captain, he was named among the top 10 captains around the world by The Football Association in 1953, becoming the first Asian to have the honor. In 1954 Mohun Bagan became the first club ever to clinch the double crown of Kolkata — CFL and IFA Shield, courtesy to Badru's solitary goal against the formidable side of Hyderabad City Police. That year Mohun Bagan beat the Austrian club Grazer by 2–1 and beat the visiting Afghanistan by 3–0. That year Subimal 'Chuni' Goswami joined the senior team from the club's youth ranks. Mohun Bagan defended the CFL title successfully till 1956 and won the IFA Shield and its first Rover's Cup in 1956. In December 1954, Mohun Bagan lost a match against AIK, featuring Kurt Hamrin, by 3–1 and in March 1955, played against the visiting Soviet Union featuring Lev Yashin and lost by 3–0. The following year Mohun Bagan also played against Austria but lost by 2–0. The following year Mohun Bagan, as a representative from India, toured Indonesia, Singapore, Hong Kong and Malaya, which was organized solely by the assistant secretary of the club Dhiren Dey. Mariappa Kempaiah, a versatile footballer playing in the offense as well as defense, joined Mohun Bagan in 1957. For the 1956 Summer Olympics in Melbourne, Badru captained the national team. While Krishnachandra 'Kesto' Pal was included in the main squad, Chuni, S Chatterjee, and Sushil Guha were selected as reserved players . The following years were mostly unsuccessful as the club failed to win several major trophies, but during this time, Mohun Bagan obtained the services of a tough and tackling defender Jarnail Singh Dhillon from Rajasthan Club. The arrival of Thazhatheri Abdul Rahman at the back partnering Singh with Sanath Sett in goal, enhanced the team. With an immediate impact, Mohun Bagan won CFL and Durand Cup in 1959.

The Golden era (1960s)
Mohun Bagan in 1960, captured CFL, IFA Shield, and Durand Cup, losing just once in 42 matches played in these three tournaments. Based on their dominative performance, They were invited to a number of matches in East Africa travelling to Uganda, Kenya, Zanzibar and Tanganyika. During the tour, out of nineteen matches 15 were won, 3 were drawn and only 1 was lost. Mohun Bagan won the Shield consecutively in 1961 and 1962. Under Dhiren Dey, a strict regime was reinstated in the club and under the coaching of Arun Sinha, scrapped the archaic 2–3–5 formation and began using 3-defenders system. Sinha was primarily responsible for properly grooming the likes of Chuni and Singh. On the recommendations of Chuni and Kempiah, Isaiyah Arumayinayigam had joined the team before the tour and proved his talents during the tour, earning the nickname "Baby Taxi". On 27 April 1962 Gostho Pal received the Padma Shri, becoming the first footballer to do so. The club won its tenth CFL title and IFA Shield that year. Chuni was selected to lead the national team in 1962 Asian Games and won the gold medal, with Jarnail Singh playing a pivotal part in the campaign.  Ashok Chatterjee, a well-built forward, was another vital addition to the team in 1962. In 1963, Mohun Bagan won CFL again and added Durand Cup to their cabinet after a 2–0 victory against Andhra Pradesh Police. A new club tent was inaugurated this year by the Chief of Army Staff Jayanto Nath Chaudhuri and the Chief Minister of West Bengal Prafulla Chandra Sen.

1964 saw Mohun Bagan celebrate its platinum jubilee with a year-long celebration involving numerous sporting events. Popular Hungarian club Tatabánya was invited to play a series of friendly matches. An exhibition cricket match was arranged between India and Commonwealth XI, featuring names like Mansoor Ali Khan Pataudi, Vijay Manjrekar, Farokh Engineer, M. L. Jaisimha, Salim Durani, Garfield Sobers, Colin Cowdrey, Mushtaq Mohammad and Lance Gibbs. An exhibition hockey match between India and Calcutta XI and tennis matches featuring the likes of Ramanathan Krishnan, Jaidip Mukerjea, Bob Hewitt and Martin Mulligan were arranged as well. A team of East German athletes was invited to take part in the athletic meet along with an Indian team. Off-the-field numerous processions and shows were organized to celebrate this occasion, and several high-profile personalities attended the festivities. Fittingly, the club enjoyed massive success in cricket by winning CAB Cricket League, in hockey by winning Aga Khan Gold Cup, in football by winning the IFA Shield, the CFL, and the Durand Cup by defeating East Bengal.

Chandreshwar Prasad, a tough and uncompromising defender skilled in the air, joined Mohun Bagan in 1965. Pungam Kannan and Sukalyan Ghosh Dastidar, famous for their long-range shots, joined the club in 1967 and 1969, respectively. In 1967 and 1968, Mohun Bagan won just two trophies, the Shield and Rover's Cup, respectively. Chuni retired from football in 1968 after spending his whole career at Mohun Bagan; thus, the golden era slowly ended. In 1969 a young and eccentric coach named Amal Dutta joined, who was also the first professional coach in India, and introduced the concept of overlapping full-backs in 4–2–4 to Indian football, for which Bhabani Roy was the primary candidate. With the new strategy in place, Mohun Bagan played scintillating football and captured CFL and IFA Shield with a 3–1 victory against East Bengal in the Shield final.

Decline and revival under P. K. Banerjee (1970s)

Mohun Bagan struggled to assert dominance in the first half of the 1970s and failed to match their arch-rivals regarding team building. Although they won Rover's Cup from 1970 to 1972, they fared poorly in other major tournaments. Mohun Bagan failed to beat East Bengal even once between 1969 and 1974 and lost to their arch-rivals in Durand Cup and IFA Shield finals multiple times. The lowest point of their decline came in 1975 IFA Shield final when Mohun Bagan lost 5–0 to East Bengal, the biggest margin of defeat in the derby till then. The ignominy surrounding the heavy defeat was that several Mohun Bagan players spent the night holed up on a boat in the Ganges as the supporters laid siege to the club tent. Umakanto Palodhi, an ardent Mohun Bagan fan, committed suicide. He wrote in his suicide note that he will be born as a Mohun Bagan footballer in the next life and will take revenge for that 0–5 defeat. In May 1972, Mohun Bagan toured to newly independent Bangladesh to play exhibition matches, where they defeated Dhaka Mohammedan in their first match, but lost to Shadhin Bangla football team later. Mohun Bagan did recruit a number of young players in 1974 and 1975 so as to steer the team back to success. Subrata Bhattacharya, an indomitable defender, Prasun Banerjee, a dictating midfielder, and Narayanswami Ulaganathan, a swift winger, joined in 1974 at a young age. In 1975, Compton Dutta, an impeccable right-back, and Dilip Palit, a combative full-back, joined the team. In 1976 the wheel had finally turned as Mohun Bagan assembled their best team in years under the helm of Chandra Madhab Roy. Along with the strong core group that joined in 1974 and 1975, the club added a host of players from their two local rivals, including Mohammed Habib, his brother Mohammed Akbar and Subhash Bhowmick. Habib was an extremely tactful attacker, Akbar was a prolific striker, and Bhowmik was one of the finest wingers. Young winger Bidesh Bose also donned the Green-Maroon jersey for the first time and would soon make his mark with his darting runs along the touchline. Pradeep Chowdhury arrived at the club to partner with Subrata in the defense. Mohun Bagan’s most important investment was in the coaching post, where Prasun's brother, P.K. Banerjee was employed after his immensely successful spell at East Bengal. Under him, 1976 turned into one of the best years in the club’s history when Mohun Bagan won their first CFL and IFA Shield titles since 1969 and added Rover's Cup to their success. In 1976, a hattrick of Bordoloi Trophy was completed along with a victory in Darjeeling Gold Cup. Most significantly, Mohun Bagan ended a seven-year wait to win the Derby in 1976 with a 17 seconds header from Akbar, assisted by Ulanganathan. Along with Shyam Thapa, other iconic names like Sudhir Karmakar and Gautam Sarkar, who were affectionately called "Indian Beckenbauer" for his snatching abilities in the midfield, also joined Mohun Bagan in the following year. Shibaji Banerjee played his first senior game for the club in 1977 after being a part of the youth teams. With one of the best squads in its history, Mohun Bagan suffered a shocking defeat of 1–0 against ITI team in the inaugural Federation Cup, which became the most prestigious title in the country, and also lost the first Derby of that year. But they successfully captured Bordoloi Trophy by thrashing Mohammedan with 4–0 and also became the first club to win the "triple crown" – the IFA Shield, the Durand Cup, and the Rover's Cup, in that year and as per club traditions, they invited East Bengal for dinner.

On 24 September 1977, through the efforts of Dhiren Dey Mohun Bagan played a friendly match against the American club New York Cosmos which featured Brazilian World Cup winners like Pelé and Carlos Alberto Torres, and Serie A icon Giorgio Chinaglia. The game, which took place at Eden Gardens, had a match attendance of 80,000 along with the Chief Minister of West Bengal Jyoti Basu. NY Cosmos had took a lead through Alberto but it was soon equalized by Thapa. Surprisingly, Mohun Bagan took the lead through Habib but late in the game, Chinaglia’s goal kept the final scoreline at 2–2. One of the remarkable instances in the game was Shibaji's brilliant save to deny a Pelé free-kick.

After the further additions of Manas Bhattacharya and Shyamal Banerjee, Mohun Bagan continued their dominant run in 1978, consisting of a CFL win with record 78 goals in 22 matches and a Federation Cup joint-win with East Bengal. In the IFA Shield final, Mohun Bagan was up against the Soviet club Ararat Yereven featuring Arkady Andreasyan and Khoren Oganesian. P.K. Banerjee lined up in a defensive 5–2–3 formation, but the visitors still took an early lead. As the visitors struggled with the wet climatic conditions, Banerjee changed to a more attacking 4–2–4 formation by bringing on winger Bidesh Bose. Bose instantly changed the game as Mohun Bagan raced to a 2–1 lead with the goals from Habib and Manas, but a late goal from Oganesian prevented a famous win for Mohun Bagan, and both the clubs were declared winners. Thus, the club became the first Indian team, post-independence, to win the IFA Shield while competing against a non-Asian side in the final. The following year, Mohun Bagan squad saw the arrival of Xavier Pius who became popular for his individual flair. Mohun Bagan had a cent percent success record winning all four trophies they participated in, including CFL, Durand Cup, and IFA Shield.

The National Club of India (1980s)
The dominance in Durand Cup and Federation Cup was continued in 1980, meanwhile CFL and IFA Shield was called off after a tragic incident that took place during the Derby on 16 August where sixteen people died in a riot among the supporters inside Vivekananda Yuba Bharati Krirangan.

In 1981 Mohun Bagan won their first standalone Federation Cup after beating Mohammedan by 2–0, and added IFA Shield and Rover's Cup to the collection as well. The club made some impactful signings like Krishanu Dey, Krishnendu Roy and Sudip 'Tulu' Chatterjee. 1983 was a comparatively unsuccessful year. After six golden years, the club only managed to win CFL, with Manas Bhattacharya being the league's top scorer. As a result, a host of new players were recruited in 1984, and the most notable names being Prasanta Banerjee, Babu Mani and Tanumoy Basu, who replaced Shibaji in the goal, and that led to major successes, including Durand Cup and CFL. Later, Sisir Ghosh was brought in, and he made a successful attacking duo with Mani. Mohun Bagan established a statue honoring Gostho Pal at Maidan. In 1986 players like Satyajit Chatterjee, Aloke Mukherjee and Amit Bhadra made to the squad, and the year ended with CFL, third consecutive Durand Cup, and Federation Cup after a four-year wait, and qualifying for 1987 Asian Club Championship for the first time. Mohun Bagan won twice in the group stage of ACC with 12 goals, half of which were scored by Sisir. However, finishing second in the group failed to progress to the semi-final group. They qualified for ACC once again for the 1988–89 season by winning the 1987 Federation Cup and displayed outstanding performance in the group stage, including a 6–0 defeat of Pakistani team Crescent Textiles Mill with a hat-trick from Sisir. Still, in the semi-final group, they lost every game and finished at the bottom. At the domestic level, the club failed to win any major tournament except Rover's Cup.

Mohun Bagan celebrated their 100th anniversary in 1989 with a grand torch rally starting from Basu Bati in North Kolkata and covered several important places in Mohun Bagan's history before reaching the Mohun Bagan Ground. The Prime Minister of India Rajiv Gandhi arrived for the celebrations and during his speech, he referred to Mohun Bagan as "The National Club of India". Fittingly, Mohun Bagan won CFL and IFA Shield by defeating Tata Football Academy in the final by 1–0.  Mohun Bagan became the first club to be honored by a postage stamp from the Government of India on this historical year.

Commercialisation and incoming of foreigners (1990–2000)

The centenary celebrations continued till 1990 when Mohun Bagan played against an assembled team that featured Cameroonian World Cupper Roger Milla. It was a disappointing year with only the CFL title in the bag, and upon that, the club lost its president Dhiren Dey, who had devoted his life to commanding the club for around five decades. Subrata Bhattacharya retired after 17 years in the team, with 52 trophies won and the accolade of the first Indian defender to score 50 career goals. After the exit of some long-serving officials from the management, a new generation of officials was elected, with prominent figures like Swapan Sadhan Bose, Anjan Mitra, Balaram Chowdhury, and Biru Chatterjee. One of the most significant changes made by the new board was a change in Mohun Bagan’s constitution which had prevented foreigners to join the club to maintain the tag of the National Club of India. The club also began to accept sponsorships for the next eight years from major institutions like SAIL, Emami, PepsiCo, and Tata Tea. The club invested significantly to bring back Krishanu Dey and Babu Mani, along with other major signings like Bikash Panji and especially I. M. Vijayan, who was being approached by every major club in the country. In 1991 Mohun Bagan made their first-ever foreign recruitment, which was a Nigerian striker Chima Okorie from East Bengal, and later the second foreign signing was another Nigerian striker Bernard Operanozie, who would play as a defender. With the arrival of Syed Nayeemuddin on the bench, Mohun Bagan defended their Rover's Cup and won another Federation Cup in 1992. The following year Oparanozie got the captain's responsibilities after Bhadra got out with injury, and being the club's first foreign captain, he led the team to win Federation Cup again. Mohun Bagan also famously won over Croatian club Varteks that year in the group stage of DCM Trophy. 1994 was a decorative year with four trophies, including Federation Cup for the third consecutive time, Durand Cup after an eight-year wait, and the CFL. While in 1993–94 Asian Club Championship, Mohun Bagan easily thumped Club Valencia and Ratnam in the preliminary stage, but after a 4–0 away loss to Thai Farmers' Bank in the 1st leg of the second round, Mohun Bagan was ejected out of the tournament for refusing to play the 2nd leg in Malaysia. India was amid plague outbreak. Mohun Bagan failed to win any major trophy for the following two years. 

In December 1996, National Football League began as the top-tier league in the country, and Mohun Bagan finished at the bottom in the group stage with just one win and was relegated in the next season, which was later revoked by the organizers. The club appointed their former coach, Amal Dutta and under him, Mohun Bagan began to play in an innovative 3–4–3 "Diamond System," which was bolstered by the likes of Abdul Khaliq and Okerie in the front, Mohun Bagan played very offensively, which was rare in Indian football. The glamorous success achieved by Amal Dutta and P.K. Banerjee, who was now coaching East Bengal, had given birth to a significant coaching rivalry between them during the 80s, which reached its peak at the 1997 Federation Cup semi-final. It was one of the most anticipated matches in Indian football history, pitting two fierce rivalries – Mohun Bagan and Amal Dutta against East Bengal and P.K. Banerjee – at one stage. With a record 131,000 attendance at Vivekananda Yuba Bharati Krirangan, Mohun Bagan’s defensive frailties were exposed by Bhaichung Bhutia, who scored a hattrick in a 4–1 victory for East Bengal. Despite the loss, fans lauded Mohun Bagan's impressive style of play under Dutta's Diamond System. Regardless, the club steered back to win the 1997–98 National Football League with ten matches unbeaten run and only two losses in the league, under the mentorship of T. K. Chathunni after Dutta left midway due to internal strife with the club officials. Players like Okorie, Dipendu Biswas, Reazul Mustafa and Sri Lankan winger Roshan Pereira played pivotal roles in the team. Mohun Bagan’s performance in January 1998 earned them the AFC title of "Diadora Team of Asia" for that month, and went on to win the Federation Cup as well.

In 1998, United Spirits, a subsidiary of Vijay Mallya owned United Breweries Group, entered into a partnership with Mohun Bagan by buying a 50% stake in the club's football division and formed a joint-venture entity named United Mohun Bagan Private Limited. For the first time the club was transformed into a corporate establishment from a society status, and the name of the club's football division was thus changed to McDowell's Mohun Bagan FC. That season saw them defeat Uzbek giant Pakhtakor Tashkent in the IFA Shield group stage, and eventually win the Shield. Mohun Bagan signed a host of foreigners for the 1999–00 National Football League. Renowned internationals like Uzbek striker Igor Shkvyrin, Nigerian forward Stephen Abarowei, Thai full-back Dusit Chalermsan and Kenyan defender Samuel "Pamzo" Omollo, and Brazilian José Ramirez Barreto joined the club. The Indian contingent in the club was kept almost intact from the last season with the addition of the striker R.C. Prakash and full-back Dulal Biswas, Mohun Bagan comfortably won the league along with Durand Cup and Rover's Cup with former club player Subrata Bhattacharya at the helm. But at the continental stage, got eliminated with an 8–0 defeat against Júbilo Iwata in the second round of the 1999–00 Asian Club Championship.

Heightened foreign influence (2000–2010)
In the 2001–02 season, Mohun Bagan's bid to win back-to-back league titles was shattered when they finished second by just a point behind East Bengal. However, Barreto finished as the league's top scorer. Mohun Bagan captured the 2001 Federation Cup due to the heroics of goalkeeper Bibhas Ghosh and Barreto, who was awarded the tournament's best player. Mohun Bagan also triumphed in the Bordoloi Trophy after thrashing Thai club Rajpracha 4–0 in the final. Mohun Bagan’s squad was joined by another Nigerian, Abdulatif Seriki replacing Omollo. On the final matchday, in a must-win situation against the title contender – Churchill Brothers, Mohun Bagan clinched their third league title with a 73rd-minute header by the Nigerian defender Abdul Wastu Saliu assisted by Basudeb Mandal's corner kick. Under Subrata Bhattacharya, Mohun Bagan became the first club to win Federation Cup and NFL in a season. One of the more significant developments saw Mohun Bagan flag off the first residential football academy by any top-flight Indian club, set up in Durgapur with the assistance of SAIL. In 2002 and 2003, the club plunged into uncertain times owing to internal administrative problems and problems with their investors. Internal strife among club officials caused a failure in retaining most of their players from the league-winning squad, including the departure of Subrata in 2003. Problems with sponsors reached such a critical stage that United Breweries threatened to sue the club at one point. Bhaichung Bhutia, who had joined the club in 2002, missed out on most of the season to injuries, producing a negligible impact on the team. As a result, Mohun Bagan’s on-field form slumped remarkably, with the club winning just one major trophy in the form of the IFA Shield in these two years. To make matters worse, in 2004, Mohun Bagan's most influential foreigner – Barreto, also left the club and Mohun Bagan finished 7th and 9th in 2002–03 and 2003–04 seasons respectively. The barren period of major trophies also continued next season, as they finished 8th in the league and runner-up in Federation Cup. In 2004, Mohun Bagan became the first Indian club to launch a credit card in association with ICICI Bank. FIFA formed an elite task force the same year and Mohun Bagan was one of only eleven clubs selected globally along with names like River Plate, Barcelona and Bayern Munich. 

With internal problems slowly subsiding, Mohun Bagan assembled a strong side in 2006 that included Barreto and Bhaichung's return, along with a combative Brazilian midfielder Douglas Silva. The team was further bolstered with top Indian players like Sangram Mukherjee, Deepak Mondal as well as youngsters like Lalawmpuia Pachuau, Lalkamal Bhowmick and Sushil Kumar Singh. With the sudden resignation of coach Biswajit Bhattacharya, the Brazilian physio of the team, Robson Mattos was hastily promoted as the team's coach. Bhutia and Sangram's collective heroics led them to their 12th Federation Cup. While the 2006–07 league season didn't go well with as many as three foreign coaches taking part during the campaign in the form of Robson Mattos and former players – Chima Okorie and Bernard Oparanozie. FIFA president Sepp Blatter came to Kolkata and attended Mohun Bagan's won 2-1 Derby win on 15 April 2007. On Mohun Bagan Day, the club became the first in India to launch an official mascot which was a tiger named "Baggu". In 2007 Mohun Bagan sealed their first-ever Indian Super Cup with a 4–0 victory over the league champions Dempo, with Bhutia scoring a hattrick. In 2007–08 season, where NFL got rebranded as I-League, Brazilian coach Carlos Roberto Pereira took the reins of the team but failed to win any significant accolade. The following season, Mohun Bagan appointed Moroccan coach Karim Bencherifa, who led the team to a record 10-match winning run in the league and a Federation Cup victory. Still, poor performance in his second league resulted in him being sacked midway through the 2009–10 season and putting Satyajit Chatterjee as the interim coach. The only highlight of his second season campaign was the 5–3 Derby victory on 25 October 2009.

In 2008, Mohun Bagan players got the opportunity to play against German icon Oliver Kahn in his official testimonial match for Bayern Munich, which also featured Brazilian star Zé Roberto. The match was played on 27 May 2008 at Vivekananda Yuba Bharati Krirangan and finished with Bayern Munich comfortably winning by 3–0. The same year Argentine World Cup winner Diego Maradona paid a visit to the club tent during a tour to India.

Strive for success and ultimate takeover by ATK (2010–20)

Ranking
Mohun Bagan emerged as third ranked Indian team, and 611 universally, in the international rankings of clubs during the first ten years of the 21st century (2001–2010), issued by the International Federation of Football History & Statistics in 2011. The club though struggled for supremacy in the first five years of the new decade, and the seasons were marked by poor team recruitment, which lacked balance and overpaying for players. The management focused only on recruiting big names while ignoring essential areas of the team which needed bolstering. Some of the foreign stars recruited during this period were Odafa Onyeka Okolie from Churchill Brothers, with a record salary of 1.4 crores per year in 2011, Muritala Ali from Mahindra United and Tolgay Özbey from East Bengal. These players failed to replicate their form shown at their former clubs and as a result Mohun Bagan teams which were often built around them also suffered. After an illustrious career at Mohun Bagan, Barreto finally made his exit in 2012. A crowd of 30,000 turned up at Vivekananda Yuba Bharati Krirangan on 6 May 2012 as Barreto played his last match for the club against Pune, where he scored his final goal for the team. The Brazilian ended his career at the club as the first foreigner to score over 200 goals in India for a club with his final tally reading 228 goals in 371 matches.

The club endured a phase of five years without a major trophy between 2010 and 2015, the longest such phase since the nation's independence. On 29 December 2012, Mohun Bagan was barred from competing in I-League for two years following a decision taken by the league's core committee. The suspension came because Mohun Bagan had refused to take the field in the second half of the match against East Bengal on 9 December 2012, citing crowd violence and an unsuitable atmosphere for the continuation of the match. All their results in the 2012-13 season were declared null and void and all their remaining fixtures were cancelled. However on 15 January 2013, Mohun Bagan appealed against the decision and were reinstated, but a hefty amount was fined, their officials were suspended from all the AIFF meetings for a year and, the team would start with 0 points and would play out only the remaining 16 fixtures in the league. This did not affect their win-loss and goal difference record in the table. This led the team in a dire relegation fight but were successful to avoided it. In the following season, the team performed disastrously and finished 8th in the table, scarcely avoiding relegation. A constant incoming and outgoing of coaches saw established names like Subrata Bhattacharya, Subhash Bhowmick and Karim Bencherifa, along with younger coaches like Stanley Rozario and Santosh Kashyap failing to end the precarious state of the team.

Mohun Bagan started the 2014–15 season with Subhash Bhowmick on the bench. However, poor performance in CFL and Bhowmick’s lack of mandatory AFC Pro license saw Sanjoy Sen taking over the reins before Federation Cup. Mohun Bagan’s Cup campaign didn't go well, and they crashed out of the tournament after a 4–1 loss against Salgaocar. Before I-League started, Sen made numerous tactical changes and played in a 4–2–3–1 formation. The trident of foreigners – Katsumi Yusa, Pierre Boya and Sony Norde was backed by energetic ball-winners like Sehnaj Singh and led by Balwant Singh in front. The defense was reinforced by veteran Bello Razaq and Pritam Kotal, while the goal was guarded by young Debjit Majumder. The final league match was against the title contender, Bengaluru at Sree Kanteerava Stadium, with just one point advantage. In the 86th minute, a corner kick from Norde was headed in Razaq to equalize the score-line to 1–1, thereby winning their first major trophy in five seasons and the first league title in eleven years. Mohun Bagan had reached their quasquicentennial year of existence in 2014, therefore club organized a huge rally in North Kolkata chiefly to celebrate the anniversary on 1 June 2015. The celebration was capped off with their league victory achieved the previous month. The victory parade saw around 200,000 supporters, by some estimates, lined up along the streets, with prominent former club associates like P.K. Banerjee, Manas Bhattacharya, Bidesh Bose, Compton Dutta, Shibaji Banerjee, and Satyajit Chatterjee involved with the celebrations. FIFA president Sepp Blatter also congratulated Mohun Bagan in a special letter. At the continental stage, Mohun Bagan became the first Indian club to win a match in AFC Champions League and qualify for the second preliminary round of ACL qualifying play-offs, when they defeated Singaporen club Tampines Rovers by 3–1. Mohun Bagan also recorded the biggest margin of victory by an Indian club in an AFC Cup away match when they defeated Hongkongese based club South China by 4–0. In that edition, the team also reached the round of 16 but got eliminated by Tampines Rovers.

After a breakaway from United Breweries in 2015, Mohun Bagan was once again re-established as a society. Still, in 2017 Mohun Bagan Football Club (India)   was registered as a legal entity on 31 July 2017. The new legal entity created was exclusively for all football activities of the Mohun Bagan Athletic Club. On 28 September 2018 in the Clash of Legends (a match between the teams of retired former players of the respective clubs), Mohun Bagan Legends hosted Barcelona Legends at Vivekananda Yuba Bharati Krirangan, that was attended by a crowd of 45,000, along with one of the directors of Barcelona Pau Vilanova and the mayor of Kolkata Sovan Chatterjee. The fixture concluded with a heavy defeat for the hosts by a score-line of 6–0. The following three seasons since the title win, Mohun Bagan continued their strong contest for trophies, but succeeding to win only the 2016 Federation Cup, though foreigners like Yusa and Norde continued to make their presence felt with strong performances, along with single season signings like Darryl Duffy and Cornell Glen. Among the Indians, Jeje Lalpekhlua, Pritam Kotal, and Prabir Das produced some of their best performances for the team. In 2018, the team managed to reach the semi-final of the inaugural Super Cup that replaced Federation Cup as the country's top knock-out tournament. The following season was considerably poor under the new coach Khalid Jamil, as the team finished 5th on the table. The club also pulled out of Super Cup along with the other participating I-League clubs in protest against the unfair schedule favoring the Indian Super League clubs. Therefore the season concluded with no national trophies in three consecutive seasons. The management appointed Kibu Vicuña for the next season, and he gave the leadership duties to Dhanachandra Singh and Gurjinder Kumar. He promoted several players like Subha Ghosh, Sk. Sahil and Kiyan Nassiri from the youth ranks to the first team and assembled a squad with a blend of youth and experience. Vicuña brought a brand of football to India, which was very similar to that commonly seen in Spain. He believed in playing a possession-based game and incorporated build-up from the back, for which he used Baba Diawara at the front and supported by Joseba Beitia with Nongdamba Naorem and V.P. Suhair running down the flanks. The midfield was dictated by Fran González while the defense was held by the strong pair of Daneil Cyrus and Fran Morante. With record 14 matches unbeaten run, Mohun Bagan sealed their second I-League title and fifth national league title on their 16th matchday with a 1–0 win over Aizawl at the Kalyani Stadium. With four matches still to be played, 2019–20 season was terminated by the AIFF due to the COVID-19 pandemic.

During this period, the organizers of ISL, as well as the club management, made efforts to include Mohun Bagan along with East Bengal in the league, and to which the football brand of the club was merged with the ownership corporation of ATK led by Dr. Sanjiv Goenka in January 2020, that allowed Mohun Bagan to play in the ISL, which was promoted as the top-tier league, along with I-League, in 2017–18. On 16 January 2020, RP-Sanjiv Goenka Group, Sourav Ganguly and Utsav Parekh, jointly bought an 80% share of Mohun Bagan's football division and the branding and footballing rights of Mohun Bagan Football Club (India) Pvt. Ltd., was transferred to the new merged company, who would field a football team under the name of ATK Mohun Bagan. The new corporate entity was launched on 10 July after a month of delay due to the pandemic and participated under the IFA registration of Mohun Bagan Football Club (India) Pvt. Ltd.

Crest

The club's current crest is circular and consists of a sailing country boat painted in green and maroon colors. The boat perhaps signifies the club's place of establishment; northern Kolkata, on the banks of the Ganges. The city was the capital during the later 19th century and a prime trade center of British India, and the primary mode of transportation was through the waterways.

The initial crest of the club, however, consisted of the picture of a Royal Bengal tiger amidst a dense jungle, probably indicating the famous mangrove forests of Bengal, the Sundarbans.

The club crest is used for all sporting activities other than the football division of the club. However, since gaining professional status at the start of the National Football League era in Indian Football, the crest of the football division of the club has changed mutatis mutandis from time to time due to change of stakeholders, all the while keeping the Green and Maroon sailboat a constant.

Stadiums

Mohun Bagan Ground

The Mohun Bagan Ground is a football stadium located in the maidan region of central Kolkata, just opposite the Eden Gardens. The stadium is operated by Mohun Bagan who currently use the stadium as a training ground, although in 2017 the ground had been used for a few of their I-League matches as well. The office and club tent is adjacent to the stadium.

This ground is mainly used for Calcutta Football League matches. The stadium has galleries on three sides and a rampart on the fourth side. The north side, a contemporary gallery of the stadium, having bucket seats installed, is for the members.

In 1977 Mohun Bagan became the first club in Maidan to have floodlights installed in their stadium. The floodlights operated till the mid-1990s, after which they were renovated and inaugurated on 25 February 2016 with an IFA Shield match between Mohun Bagan U19s and DSK-Liverpool Academy.

Supporters
The fans, known as Mariners, have the reputation of being very loyal and respectful of the club, whom they often consider to be a mother-like figure in their lives. They have had the distinction of the highest attendance during the club's tenure in I-League. There are several fan clubs dedicated to Mohun Bagan in different parts of India. Mohun Bagan had the highest average attendance with an average home crowd of 17,068 in the 2013–14 season, as per the AIFF reports. In the 2014-15 I-League season, their vocal support in away matches in Pune, Mumbai and Bengaluru was arguably unseen in Indian football until then.

In 2015 an all-female supporters' group called Lady Mariners, was established. The group became India's first all-female football supporter's club.

Around 2016, ultras of Mariners, called Mariners' Base Camp, was formed with its various wings spread all around India, to revolutionize the Indian football fan movement through tifos, chants, slogans and pyrotechnics.

A premium fanbase of Mohun Bagan across entire Bengal is called Mariners of Bengal. The members of the fanbase are scattered across different areas of Bengal. And they are each promoting Mohun Bagan in their area.

The Economic Times, a leading Indian newspaper, reported that the club had an average attendance of over 35,000 in their home matches, possibly an I-League record. Over 21,000 attended the league decider of the 2014-15 I-League between Mohun Bagan and Bengaluru FC in Bengaluru, of this ".. over 8,000 were away fans, traveling from as far as Kolkata, Mumbai and Pune to watch the game", noted Sunando Dhar, chief executive officer of the I-League in the same article. Their grand reception when, by some estimates, over 200,000 fans gathered to greet the 2014-15 I-League clinching squad (on their way back to Kolkata from Bengaluru) has been dubbed as "legendary", "unparalleled" and "surreal" by the press as well as football historians.

Mohun Bagan fans have also provided financial help to the club during times of struggle. In the early 2000s, a Mohun Bagan fan mortgaged his house to raise funds for signing Brazilian superstar Jose Ramirez Barreto. In 2013 another fan donated his entire monthly salary to the club.

Crazy and passionate football fans, Pannalal and Chaitali Chatterjee, who traveled abroad to 10 FIFA World Cups to represent India's footballing passion, had once said, “You can cut open my wrist. You will see Mohun Bagan running in my veins, and nothing will ever change that.” 

On 29 July 2020 (Mohun Bagan Day), Marines abroad took an initiative to feature the club on the billboards of NASDAQ at Times Square, in order to celebrate the occasion during the times of pandemic when all the fans in India were under a lockdown. This made Mohun Bagan the first ever Indian sports entity to be featured on the NASDAQ billboards at Times Square. FIFA posted about this moment on Twitter.

Celebrity Mohun Bagan fans include Hemendra Kumar Ray, Manna Dey, Jyoti Basu, R. D. Burman, Sourav Ganguly, Amitabh Bachchan, Uttam Kumar, Mithun Chakraborty, and many more.

Rivalry

Mohun Bagan's biggest rivalry is with city rivals East Bengal and is popularly known as the Kolkata Derby. Mohun Bagan also had an intense rivalry with Mohammedan SC but the importance of this match has fizzled out in the past two decades because the teams only meet once a year in the Calcutta Football League.

Kolkata Derby

Kolkata Derby or the Boro Match is a football match between Mohun Bagan (now ATK Mohun Bagan) and East Bengal.

Till 29 October 2022, 383 matches have been played between the two teams out of which Mohun Bagan (now ATK Mohun Bagan) has won 126 matches and East Bengal have won 132 times (including all competitive matches and exhibition games) and rest of the matches ended in draws.

The first match between the sides was played on 8 August 1921 in the Coochbehar Cup, and the semifinal match ended in a 0–0 draw. Mohun Bagan won the replayed semifinal 3–0. Rabi Ganguly scored the first-ever derby goal in that match, and the other two goals were scored by Poltu Dasgupta and Abhilash Ghosh.

The first CFL match between the sides was played on 28 May 1925 in CFL, where East Bengal beat Mohun Bagan 1–0. Mohun Bagan holds the record of scoring the fastest goal in a derby (24 July 1976, a 17-second goal from Md Akbar of Mohun Bagan). They have the record of winning two consecutive derbies on two successive days (7 and 8 August 1935) and had the unique distinction of losing only one derby in 7 years (1933 to 1939).

A few notable victories include the Darbhanga Shield match on 5 September 1934, when Bagan won 4–1 (Amiyo Deb scored all four goals, the only time a player scored four goals in this derby), and a 5–3 win in an I-League encounter on 25 October 2009 (Chidi Edeh scored four goals). They have won several derbies scoring four goals against East Bengal. One such instance was in Raja Memorial Shield final played on 6 August 1937 at the common ground of both the clubs (Vivekananda Yuba Bharati Krirangan), where Bagan beat East Bengal 4–0 and Asit Ganguly scored three goals in that match.

Ownership and finances 
Mohun Bagan AC is registered as a society under Societies Registration Act, 1860 and West Bengal Societies Registration Act, 1961. Unlike many other top sports clubs in the country which are limited companies, it is not possible to purchase shares in the club, but only membership. The registered members forms the Mohun Bagan Society, which takes part in the general elections for the appointment for various posts. The club is governed by its own "constitution". Amendments and resolutions are passed via annual general meetings.

However, the football department was registered as a private limited company in 1998 after a joint venture with United Breweries Group. Presently, KGSPL own the 80% share of football entity and consortium known as ATK Mohun Bagan Private Limited. RPSG Group founder Sanjiv Goenka is the principal owner of the organization while former Indian cricketer Sourav Ganguly and businessman Utsav Parekh are co-owners. They own 80% of the shares while Mohun Bagan Athletic Club also acts a co-owner, owning 20% of the organization.

Notable players 

The eleven players of the 1911 IFA Shield winning team are often regarded as the Amar Ekadash.

Top scorers in NFL/I-League

Top scorers in Calcutta Football League
Note: Only players with more than 50 goals have been listed below.

Mohun Bagan Day
On 10 July 1911, Mohun Bagan had begun their third IFA Shield campaign. The tournament continued for the next 19 days, with Mohun Bagan eventually becoming the champions by defeating the East Yorkshire Regiment team. Thus, for the first time, a native club defeated the British and the British-Indian teams in a football tournament.

Since 2001, July 29 is celebrated as 'Mohun Bagan Day' in honor of the club's victory over East Yorkshire Regiment in the 1911 IFA Shield Final.

Campaign

Mohun Bagan Ratna

Mohun Bagan Ratna is an award presented each year on Mohun Bagan Day to outstanding former players, irrespective of the sports played. The first recipient was former captain Sailen Manna.

Current board 
{| class="wikitable"
|-
!style="background:#1A5026; color:white; text-align:center;"|Office
!style="background:#7A1024; color:white; text-align:center;"|Name
|-
| President
| Swapan Sadhan Bose
|-
| rowspan="5"|Vice president 
| Moloy Ghatak
|-
| Arup Roy
|-
| Kunal Ghosh
|-
| Asit Chatterjee
|-
|Sohini Mitra
|-
| General Secretary
| Debasish Dutta
|-
| Assistant Secretary
| Satyajit Chatterjee
|- 
| Treasurer
| Uttam Kumar Saha
|-
| Finance secretary
| Mukul Singha
|-
| Football secretary
| Swapan Banerjee
|-
| Cricket secretary
| Mahesh Kumar Tekriwal
|-
| Hockey secretary
| Subhasish Pal
|-
| Tennis secretary 
| Sandipan Banerjee
|-
| Ground secretary
| Pintu Biswas
|-
| Athletics secretary
| Debashish Mitra
|-
| Youth football secretary
| Manas Bhattacharya
|-

Season overview
The club's competitive record since the inception of the first national-level league until 2020 is listed below.

Honours

Major titles
Note: The following honours are only the AIFF certified titles that Mohun Bagan have won.

Awards
 Banga Bibhushan: 2022 (the highest civilian honour in West Bengal given by the Government of West Bengal)

Performance in AFC competitions

Filmography
 Arun Roy, এগারো: The Immortal Eleven, 2011

Further reading

See also
 Club of Pioneers
 Oldest football clubs
 ATK Mohun Bagan FC
 Mohun Bagan A.C. (cricket)
 Mohun Bagan A.C. (youth)

References

External links

 
Association football clubs established in 1889
I-League clubs
Football clubs in Kolkata
1889 establishments in British India
ATK Mohun Bagan FC
Sports clubs in India
Multi-sport clubs in India